Giurgiu is a city in Romania.

Giurgiu may also refer to:

 Giurgiu County, county of Romania
 Giurgiu (Bâsca Mică), a tributary of the river Bâsca Mică in Buzău County, Romania
 Giurgiu, a tributary of the river Zăbala in Vrancea County, Romania
 FC Dunărea Giurgiu, football team from Giurgiu
 FC Astra Giurgiu, football team from Giurgiu

People with the surname
Gabriel Giurgiu, Romanian football player

Romanian-language surnames